The Deputy President of South Africa is the deputy to the President, of the Republic of South Africa and is a member of the National Assembly and the Cabinet. 

The Deputy President is constitutionally required to "assist the president in the execution of the functions of government", and may be assigned any government portfolio by presidential proclamation. 

The Deputy President performs the duties of the President when the president is outside the country's borders, unable to fulfill the duties of the office, or when the presidency is vacant. 

The Deputy President is generally appointed as the leader of government business in the Parliament of South Africa by the President.

Under the interim constitution (valid from 1994 to 1996), there was a Government of National Unity, in which a member of parliament from the largest opposition party was entitled to a position as deputy president. Along with Mbeki, the previous State President, F. W. de Klerk, also served as Deputy President in his capacity as the leader of the National Party, then the second-largest party in the new parliament. De Klerk later resigned and went into opposition with his party. A voluntary coalition government continues to exist under the new constitution (adopted in 1996), although there have been no appointments of opposition politicians to the post of Deputy President.

The official living residences of the deputy president are Oliver Tambo House in Pretoria, Highstead in Cape Town and Dr John L Dube House in Durban.

Inception and expiry of term

The Deputy President's term of office is not fixed by law. The Deputy President's term begins upon appointment from by the President. The Deputy President must be selected from the members of the National Assembly and takes a prescribed oath.

The Deputy President's term is ended by one of four constitutional mechanisms: dismissal by the President, a successful 'motion of no confidence in the president' by the National Assembly, a successful 'motion of no confidence excluding the president' by the National Assembly, or a newly elected President's assumption of office. Presumably, a statement of resignation would also be sufficient to end a Deputy President's term of office.

Informal roles
Depending on the extent of any informal roles and functions of the deputy president depend on the specific relationship between the president and deputy president, but often the roles include tasks like:
Spokesperson for the administration policies 
Adviser to the President

Deputy Presidents of South Africa (1994–present)
Parties

See also

List of current vice presidents 
Vice State President of South Africa
President of South Africa

References

Deputy President
Politics of South Africa
South Africa